Saint-Jacques is a civil parish in Madawaska County, New Brunswick, Canada. The parish consists of two discontiguous portions separated by Saint-Joseph Parish.

For governance purposes the southwestern portion is divided between the city of Edmundston, which includes the tier of grants on either side of the Madawaska River, and the Northwest rural district; the northeastern portion is part of the rural district. Both city and rural district are members of the Northwest Regional Service Commission.

Before the 2023 governance reform, the parish was divided between Edmundston and the local service district of the parish of Saint-Jacques, part of which was annexed by Edmundston in the reform.

Origin of name
The parish is named for the local Roman Catholic church.

History
Saint-Jacques was erected in 1877 from Madawaska Parish; the name was spelt without a hyphen.

In 1930 part of Saint-Jacques was included in the newly erected Saint-Joseph Parish.

In 1941 the boundary was altered.

In 1946 Saint-Jacques was affected by the major reorganisation of Madawaska County parish boundaries.

In 1973 the hyphen was added to the parish's legal name.

Boundaries
Saint-Jacques Parish comprises two discontiguous portions: the populated southwestern portion and the interior northeastern portion, which lacks provincial roads.

The southeastern portion is bounded:
 on the northwest by the Quebec border;
 on the east, running entirely along grant lines, beginning on the provincial border at a point about 75 metres southwest of Ruisseau du Coin, then running generally southerly along the eastern line of the Sweeney Settlement grants, which straddle Ruisseau Richard Road and then Iroquois Road, until it passes the Petite rivière Iroquois (formerly the East Iroquois River) near Roussel et Martin Road, then westerly along the southern line of grants to Meril Grandmaison and Marcel Grandmaison, to the northeastern line of Tier Three of the Plourde Settlement, which straddles Iroquois Road, then southeasterly along Tier Three to a point about 200 metres past the Petite rivière Iroquois, at the easternmost corner of a grant to David A. Rousseau, then southwesterly along the southeastern line of grants to Rousseau and Pierre Plourde to the northeastern line of Tier Two of Plourde Settlement at a point about 150 metres northwest of the NB Power transmission line, then southeasterly along Tier Two to the Saint-Joseph Road, then southwesterly along the southern line of a grant to Joseph Theriault to the junction of St. Onge Road and Saint Joseph Road on the northeastern line of Tier One of the Plourde Settlement, which fronts on the eastern shore of the Madawaska River, then southeasterly along Tier One to the easternmost corner of a grant to Cyprien Michaud, about 200 metres north of the bridge across the Iroquois River on Olivier Boucher Road;
 on the south, running entirely along grant lines, southwesterly along the southeastern line of the Michaud grant, then nearly a kilometre upstream on the Madawaska, then southwesterly and westerly along the southern line of a grant to Charles Hughes, which is in Tier One of Trout Brook Settlement, to Farline Road, on the eastern line of Tier Two of Trout Brook Settlement, then southerly about 1.2 kilometres along Tier Two to its southern end, then southwesterly along the southeastern line of Tier Two and Tier Three of Trout Brook Settlement, then northwesterly along Tier Six of the Riceville Settlement, which straddles Guerrette Road and Richard Road, to its end, then southwesterly about 550 metres along the end of Tier Six to the southernmost corner of a grant to Denis H. Nadeau, then northwesterly along the southwestern line of the Nadeau grant, passing through the junction of Sisson Road and Paradis Road, to the eastern line of Tier Three of the Michaud Settlement;
 on the west, running entirely along grant lines, beginning at the corner of the Nadeau grant and running northerly about 750 metres along Tier Three to the northeastern corner of a grant to Joseph P. Nadeau, then southwesterly along the southern line of a grant to Felix Marquis to the western line of Tier Three, then northerly and northwesterly along Tier Three, this section of which straddles Sisson Road, to the provincial border.

The northwestern portion is bounded:
 on the northeast by the Restigouche County line;
 on the east by Green River;
 on the southwest by Lake Branch, which runs through First Lake, Second Lake, and Third Lake;
 on the west by the provincial border

Communities
Communities at least partly within the parish. bold indicates an incorporated municipality; italics indicate a name no longer in official use

 Edmundston
 Saint-Jacques
 Ennemond
 Grandmaison
 Moulin-Morneault
 Patrieville
 Petite-Rivière-à-la-Truite
 Quatre-Coins
 Rivière-à-la-Truite
 St. Joseph Settlement
 Sweeney Settlement

Bodies of water
Bodies of water at least partly within the parish.

 Rivière à la Truite
 Green River (French Rivière Verte)
 Iroquois River
 Madawaska River
 Paradis Stream
 Lake Branch
 First Lake
 Petit lac Saint-Jean
 Second Lake
 Third Lake
 Twin Lakes

Other notable places
Parks, historic sites, and other noteworthy places at least partly within the parish.
 Edmundston Airport
 Falls Brook Protected Natural Area
 Green River North Protected Natural Area
 République Provincial Park

Demographics
Parish population total does not include portion in Edmundston

Population

Language

See also
List of parishes in New Brunswick

Notes

References

Local service districts of Madawaska County, New Brunswick
Parishes of Madawaska County, New Brunswick